Wilier Triestina was an Italian professional cycling team that existed from 1946 to 1951. It was sponsored by Italian bicycle manufacturer Wilier Triestina. Fiorenzo Magni won the general classification of the 1948 Giro d'Italia with the team.

References

External links

Defunct cycling teams based in Italy
1946 establishments in Italy
1951 disestablishments in Italy
Cycling teams established in 1946
Cycling teams disestablished in 1951